The Indian locomotive class WDS-8 is a class of diesel-electric locomotive that was developed in 1979 by the Chittaranjan Locomotive Works for Indian Railways, but ended up being delivered exclusively to the private sector. The model name stands for broad gauge (W), Diesel (D), Shunter (S) engine, 8th generation (8). They entered service in 1979. A total of five WDS-8 locomotives was built at Chittaranjan Locomotive Works (CLW), Chittaranjan between 1979 and 1982.

All WDS-8 units were exported to the Steel Authority of India. As of November 2020, these locomotives have been withdrawn from service.

History 
The history of the WDS-8 class begins in the early 1970s with the Railway Board's dual aims of addressing the shortcomings of the previous class of shunter/switcher locomotive  (WDS-4) and of removing all of Indian Railways' steam locomotives from operational service by a target date of 1990. The WDS-8 was a competing bid from CLW to the Banaras Locomotive Works's WDS-6 class, intended for industrial concerns in the private sector as well as for the Railways itself. The WDS-8 had a MAK diesel engine with a maximum output of 800 HP which was similar to the engine used in the newly upgraded YDM-1 class. They possessed short cabs modeled on those of CLW's electric locomotives with a single long, narrow hood. But unfortunately, this design was severely underpowered compared to the WDS-6 class.

As a result of these shortcomings, CLW decided not to produce any more WDS-8 locomotives after these 5 units and they were then transferred  to the plants of the Steel Authority of India (SAIL).

As of November 2020, no locomotives of this class are in service.

See also

 Rail transport in India#History
 Locomotives of India
 Rail transport in India

References

Notes

Bibliography

Bo-Bo locomotives
Chittaranjan Locomotive Works locomotives
Railway locomotives introduced in 1979
5 ft 6 in gauge locomotives
S-8